The 1983 Vale of Glamorgan Borough Council election was held on Thursday 5 May 1983 to the Vale of Glamorgan Borough Council in South Glamorgan, Wales. It took place on the same day as other district council elections in Wales and England. The Conservative Party won a healthy majority on the council.

The previous Vale of Glamorgan Council election took place in 1979 and the next full elections took place in 1987.

Ward changes
A number of ward changes came into effect at this election, particularly in the town of Penarth, which was divided into three new wards, Alexandra, Cornerswell and Stanwell. The overall number of councillors elected reduced to 46.

Overview
The Conservatives increased their majority at this election. After the results of the Alexandra ward were declared the following day, they held 32 of the 46 seats.

Despite taking control of Penarth Town Council the previous year, the SDP-Liberal Alliance had a very disappointing result, failing to win a seat. They had hoped to win seats in Barry, where Labour's Allan Maidment and Hector Gosling had defected to the Alliance.

In the Llandough ward, the sitting Conservative Mayor of the Vale of Glamorgan, Susan Thomas, lost her seat, though by only three votes.

|}

Ward Results
Contests took place in 19 of the 21 wards.(a)(b)

Alexandra (five seats)

Counting was not completed overnight and had to be resumed the following day.

Baruc (two seats)

Buttrills (two seats)

Cadoc (three seats)

Castleland (two seats)

Cornerswell (two seats)

Court (two seats)

Cowbridge (three seats)

Dinas Powys (four seats)

Dyfan (two seats)

Gibbonsdown (two seats)

Illtyd (three seats)

Llandough (one seat)

Mayor of the Vale of Glamorgan, Susan Thomas, lost by only three votes after three recounts.

Llandow (one seat)

Llantwit Major (four seats)

Peterston-super-Ely (one seat)

Rhoose (two seats)

St Athan (one seat)

Stanwell (two seats)

Sully (one seat)

Wenvoe (one seat)

(a) Elections Centre source also compares the percentage vote of the lead candidate for each party in the ward. It indicates (in some wards) which candidates are female.
(b) South Wales Echo source also indicates existing councillors "but, because of boundary changes, not necessarily representing the ward being contested". It gives middle initials. It lists the 'green' candidates as "Ecology" and the 'Liberal/SDP' as "Alliance".

* existing councillor, standing for re-election

References

Vale of Glamorgan Council elections
Vale of Glamorgan